Orne is the name of a department in France. It may also refer to:

Orne (surname), list of people with the surname
Orne (river), river in Normandy, northwestern France
Orne (Moselle), river in Lorraine, northeastern France
Orne Harbor,  cove in the Antarctic Peninsula